The Sanremo Music Festival 1984 was the 34th annual Sanremo Music Festival, held at the Teatro Ariston in Sanremo, province of Imperia, between 2 and 4 February 1984 and broadcast by Rai 1.

The show was presented by Pippo Baudo, who also served as the artistic director, assisted by Iris Peynado, Elisabetta Gardini, Tiziana Pini and Edy Angelillo.

The winners of the Big Artists section were Al Bano and Romina Power with the song "Ci sarà", while Patty Pravo won the Critics Award with "Per una bambola". Eros Ramazzotti won the Newcomers section with the song "Terra promessa".

"Favola triste", sung by Silvia Conti, was disqualified because it turned out to be not unpublished. It was replaced with the song "Pomeriggio a Marrakech", sung by the duo I Trilli. Loretta Goggi, which was supposed to participate with the song "Un amore grande", retired at the last minute and was replaced by Pupo, who eventually ranked fourth.

Participants and results

Big Artists

Newcomers

Guests

References 

Sanremo Music Festival by year
1984 in Italian music
1984 music festivals